Hangar 1 Vodka is a vodka brand produced by The Hangar 1 Distillery in Alameda, California. In addition to vodka, the distillery also produces spirits, some of which were formerly produced by St. George Spirits. The brand is owned and distributed by Proximo Spirits of Jersey City, New Jersey, and is available as a straight vodka as well as in a variety of flavors.

History
St. George Spirits was founded as America's first eau de vie distillery in 1982 by Jörg Rupf. Rupf grew up in Germany's Black Forest to a family of distillers. He went into law and became, at the time, Germany's youngest judge. On a visit to the University of California at Berkeley in the late 1970s, he decided to stay and distill local fruit to produce eau de vie. In August 2001, Rupf met with fellow artisan distiller Ansley Coale, president of Craft Distillers and a collaborator in Germain-Robin brandy, to discuss producing flavored vodkas using a method similar to the production of eau de vie.

Hangar 1 Vodka was founded in 2001, with Rupf overseeing production and Coale handling design and marketing. Operations were initially based in St. George's distillery in Hangar 1, a 2,000 square-foot World War II-era hangar at the old Alameda Naval Air Station, before expanding to a 60,000 square-foot hangar in Alameda, California, in 2004. In April 2010, Hangar 1 Vodka was acquired by Proximo Spirits, who continued to produce the vodka in Alameda through St. George. until the Summer of 2014. It is now produced in the building next to St George's distillery which it shares with Faction Brewery.

Description
Hangar 1 is a small batch vodka made from a blend of pot-distilled Viognier grapes and column still-distilled American wheat. The flavored varieties are created by infusing the vodka base with fresh fruit, and then distilling the vodka in a pot still. The fruits are obtained in-season from farms throughout the US. The distillation process takes about four weeks per batch from start to finish. Hangar 1's flavored vodkas contain fruits including Kaffir lime and Buddha's Hand citron, as well as experimental flavors such as Chipotle.

Varieties

Ratings
The Fraser River Raspberry flavor received a score of 96–100 from Wine Enthusiast in 2005, while Mandarin Blossom received a score of 97 in 2010, the Straight variety was given a score of 93 one year later, and Maine Wild Blueberry a 92 the year after that.

Marketing
In May 2011, a 120-foot-long Hangar 1 Vodka blimp was introduced, touring the US to promote the vodka. It set off on a six-month tour in 2011, with stops in 30 different cities. In August 2011, during a thunderstorm, the blimp broke free of its moorings in Columbus, Ohio, and landed in a 94-year-old Ohio woman's backyard. The blimp was repaired and continued its tour through California in 2012. It provided some of the coverage for California sporting events, including San Francisco Giants games.

References

External links
 

American vodkas
Food and drink in the San Francisco Bay Area
Distilleries in California
2002 establishments in California
Companies based in Alameda, California